The following highways are numbered 366:

Canada
Manitoba Provincial Road 366
 Nova Scotia Route 366
 Quebec Route 366

India
 National Highway 366 (India)

Japan
 Route 366 (Japan)

Malaysia 

  Federal Route 366

United States
  U.S. Route 366
  U.S. Route 366 (1926)
  U.S. Route 366 (1932–1939)
  Arizona State Route 366
  Florida State Road 366
  Georgia State Route 366 (former)
 Hawaii Route 366
  Louisiana Highway 366
  Maryland Route 366
  Mississippi Highway 366
  Missouri Route 366
  New York State Route 366
  Ohio State Route 366
  Pennsylvania Route 366
  Texas State Highway Spur 366
  Virginia State Route 366
Territories
  Puerto Rico Highway 366